The Solona is a left tributary of the river Someș in Romania. It discharges into the Someș in Surduc.

References

Rivers of Romania
Rivers of Sălaj County